Kraków Voivodeship may also refer to:
Kraków Voivodeship (14th century – 1795)
Kraków Voivodeship (1816–1837)
Kraków Voivodeship (1919–1939)
Kraków Voivodeship (1945–1975)
Kraków Voivodeship (1975–1998)